Trade-union debate was a political discussion between the end of 1920 and the spring of 1921 inside the Russian Communist Party (Bolsheviks) on the role of the trade unions in Soviet Russia. The debate's result was a rejection by the 10th Congress of the Russian Communist Party of the views of Trotsky, who was supported by the 9th Secretariat (Nikolay Krestinsky, Yevgeni Preobrazhensky and Leonid Serebryakov), the Workers' Opposition, and the Democratic Centralists. The resolution On the Role and Tasks of the Trade Unions, which incorporated Vladimir Lenin’s definition of the role of the trade unions as educational organizations and schools of administration, economic management and communism, was adopted by a majority vote.

The three secretaries of the Central Committee then had to resign. Krestinsky lost his Politburo, Orgburo, and Secretariat posts and became the Soviet ambassador to Germany.

See also 
 Leon Trotsky: Trade union debate (1920–1921)

References

Sources 
 Twiss T. M. Trotsky and the Problem of Soviet Bureaucracy. — Haymarket Books, 2015. — P. 52 – 502 p. — (Historical Materialism Book Series, ISSN 1570-1522, Vol. 67). — . — .
 Daniels, Robert Vincent (1960) The Conscience of the Revolution: Communist Opposition in Soviet Russia, New York: Simon and Schuster, pp. 129–36.
 Day, Richard (1973) Leon Trotsky and the Politics of Economic Isolation, London: Cambridge University Press, pp. 37–43.
 Deutscher, Isaac (1950) Soviet Trade Unions: Their Place in Soviet Labour Policy, London: Royal Institute of International Affairs, pp. 42–58.
 Harding, Neil (1983) Lenin’s Political Thought: Theory and Practice in the Democratic and Socialist Revolutions, in two volumes, Highlands, New Jersey: Humanities Press, vol. 2, pp. 256–274.
 Schapiro, Leonard (1977) The Origin of the Communist Autocracy: Political Opposition in the Soviet State–First Phase, 1917–1922, Cambridge, MA: Harvard University Press, pp. 273–295.
 Service (1995) Lenin: A Political Life, in three volumes, vol. 3, The Iron Ring, London: Macmillan, pp. 152–156.
 Tsuji, Yoshimas (1989) ‘The Debate on the Trade Unions, 1920–21’, Revolutionary Russia, 2, 1: 31–100.

Communist Party of the Soviet Union
Trade unions in the Soviet Union
1920 in Russia
1921 in Russia